The Wiwon Dam or Weiyuan Dam is a gravity dam on the Yalu River between China and North Korea. It was constructed between 1979 and 1987. The dam's six 65 MW generators were commissioned in 1987 and 1988. It is jointly owned and operated by China and North Korea.

See also

List of dams and reservoirs in China
List of major power stations in Jilin

References

Dams in China
Hydroelectric power stations in Jilin
Dams completed in 1987
Dams on the Yalu River
Dams in North Korea
Hydroelectric power stations in North Korea
China–North Korea relations
1987 establishments in China
1987 establishments in North Korea
Buildings and structures in Chagang Province